This article contains an event and a birth from 1957 in Estonia.

Events
The system of Ministries of Industry in the USSR, including ESSR, is replaced by the Councils of National Economy (Sovnarkhoz).

Births
Film director Sulev Keedus is born on July 21.

Deaths

References

 
1950s in Estonia
Estonia
Estonia
Years of the 20th century in Estonia